The Lincoln Boulevard Transit Corridor is a proposed  bus rapid transit or light rail transit line in the Metro network in Los Angeles, California. It is planned to operate on a north to south route on Lincoln Boulevard between the  C and  K Line's LAX/Metro Transit Center station with the  E Line's Downtown Santa Monica station on the Metro Rail system. A proposed completion date of 2047 for BRT and an unknown date for rail conversion. It is funded by Measure M & R. The route will have signal priority at traffic lights and will have a dedicated right of way.

History
One seat ride from LAX/Metro Transit Center station to the Downtown Santa Monica station via a bus rapid transit corridor along Lincoln Bl. The BRT will be converted to a rail service in the future if ridership outgrows the bus rapid service capacity, but there is currently no funding for a light rail conversion. The corridor will service LAX, Playa Del Rey, Westchester, Venice and Santa Monica, all beach communities along Santa Monica bay.

References

External links
 https://www.metro.net/projects/

Los Angeles Metro Busway projects
 Metro Rapid
Los Angeles Metro Rail projects
Metro Rapid
Proposed railway lines in California
Transportation in Los Angeles